Vangelis Kousoulakis (Greek: Βαγγέλης Κουσουλάκης; born 16 April 1954) is a Greek former professional footballer who played as a midfielder.

Career
He started his career at Iraklis in 1971. He was a part of the team that won the Greek Cup in 1976. In 1979, Kousoulakis joined Olympiacos winning four championships in 1980, 1981, 1982 and 1983. He played for them until the summer of 1986 when he transferred at Apollon Kalamarias. He ended his career in 1988.

Honours
Iraklis
 Greek Cup: 1975–76

Olympiacos
 Alpha Ethniki: 1979–80, 1980–81, 1981–82, 1982–83
 Greek Cup: 1980–81

External links
 Κουσουλάκης: "Το ελληνικό ποδόσφαιρο έχει καταντήσει πλέον αηδία"

1954 births
Living people
Greek footballers
Greece international footballers
Iraklis Thessaloniki F.C. players
Olympiacos F.C. players
Apollon Pontou FC players
Super League Greece players
Footballers from Thessaloniki
Association football midfielders